Oslo String Quartet was formed in 1991 by Geir Inge Lotsberg and  (violins), Are Sandbakken (viola), and Øystein Sonstad (cello). It was among the 1994 prize winners of the London International String Competition, which is among the most prestigious string quartet competitions internationally. In 2007 Skalstad left the quartet in order to pursue a conducting career. Liv Hilde Klokk replaced him from the start of 2008. The quartet regularly at music festivals in Scandinavia and elsewhere, including Wigmore Hall in London and Carnegie Hall in New York. The quartet was awarded Komponistforeningens pris (the Prize of the Norwegian Association of Composers) in 1998 and the Kritikerprisen (the Norwegian Critics Prize for Music) for 1999–2000. Their CD recordings of Carl Nielsen's quartets won them a 1999 "Editor's Choice" nomination in the international journal The Gramophone, which stated "Artistically it is the finest at any price point ... totally dedicated, idiomatic performance ... full of vitality and spirit and refreshingly straightforward". 

Their CD recordings include music by Edvard Grieg, David Monrad Johansen, Knut Nystedt, Klaus Egge, Fartein Valen, Johan Kvandal, Alfred Janson, Carl Nielsen, Magnar Åm, Lasse Thoresen, Ragnar Søderlind, Johan Svendsen, Jean Sibelius, Hugo Wolf, Ketil Stokkan, and Alban Berg.

To mark their 15 years anniversary, the quartet staged a two-week The Beethoven Code project during November 2006, where all of Beethoven's string quartets were performed over eight concerts, in the library building at the University of Oslo. An integral part of these series of concerts was a string of lectures by prominent scholars on various aspects of Beethoven's life and the impact of his music. The Beethoven Code project also included the making and screening of the film Brødrene Gahl og jakten på Beethovenkoden, conceived, librettoed and directed by Sonstad, and featuring the four musicians as actors. The film depicts the spiritual and existential fight and plight of Beethoven's four illegitimate children, who use the power of Große Fuge against the dark stamitzian forces of bratsjismen (violism). 

Violist Magnus Boye Hansen joined the quartet in 2018.

Members 
 Geir Inge Lotsberg, violin
 Liv Hilde Klokk (since 2008); Per Kristian Skalstad (until 2007), violin 
 Magnus Boye Hansen (since 2018); Are Sandbakken (before 2018), viola
 Øystein Sonstad, cello

External links  
 The Oslo String Quartet
 The Beethoven Code
 Brødrene Gahl og jakten på Beethovenkoden

String quartets
Norwegian classical music groups
Musical groups established in 1991
1991 establishments in Norway
Musical groups from Oslo